Amaryllis is a super-yacht built in 2011 at the shipyard Abeking & Rasmussen. The interior and exterior design of Amaryllis was done by Reymond Langton Design Ltd. The yacht has three sister-ships, C2, Eminence and Titan.

Design 
The materials of the hull is Steel, with the superstructure made out of Aluminium. The yacht is Lloyd's registered, issued by Cayman Islands.

The boat can accommodate 14 guests and 19 crew members.

Engines 
The main engines are two Caterpillar Inc. 3516 DITA with a power of  each.

See also 
 Eminence
 C2
 Titan
 Motor yacht
 List of motor yachts by length
 List of yachts built by Abeking & Rasmussen

References

2011 ships
Motor yachts
Ships built in Germany